Ethmia notomurinella is a moth in the family Depressariidae. It is found in Argentina.

References

Moths described in 1973
notomurinella